Pablo Infante Muñoz (born 20 March 1980) is a Spanish former footballer who played as a left winger.

A late bloomer, he spent most of his professional career at Mirandés, appearing in nearly 350 competitive games and amassing Segunda División totals of 55 matches and 11 goals for the club (104/15 overall).

Club career

Mirandés
Born in Burgos, Castile and León, Infante played at youth level with local Real Burgos CF, Vadillos CF and Racing Lermeño. His first six years as a senior were spent in amateur football.

Infante made his professional debut in the 2005–06 season, with CD Mirandés in the fourth division, which he helped promote to the third level in his fourth year. In 2011–12, his name became known in Spain after the Castile and León club's performances in the campaign's Copa del Rey, disposing of La Liga sides Villarreal CF and Racing de Santander, with the player scoring four of the team's six goals in those four matches, and eventually being crowned the competition's top scorer; in the domestic league, he netted 13 times in the regular season alone to help his team promote to division two for the first time ever.

On 28 June 2012, the 32-year-old Infante renewed his contract with Mirandés for one further season. He played his first game in the second tier on 17 August, starting in a 0–1 home loss against SD Huesca.

Infante scored his professional goals on 1 September 2012, netting a brace in a 4–0 away victory over Xerez CD.

Ponferradina
On 13 July 2014, after a nine-year spell at the Estadio Municipal de Anduva, Infante signed a one-year deal with fellow league club SD Ponferradina. He scored four times from 32 appearances in his debut campaign, adding seven assists for the seventh-placed team.

Personal life
After numerous media interviews in Spain, it emerged that Infante spent years refusing offers from club in higher divisions due to his work as director of a bank branch, located 50 kilometers from Mirandés' facilities.

He was a graduate in Business Administration from the University of Burgos, and played the vast majority of his career in teams in the Province of Burgos.

References

External links

1980 births
Living people
Sportspeople from Burgos
Spanish footballers
Footballers from Castile and León
Association football wingers
Segunda División players
Segunda División B players
Tercera División players
Divisiones Regionales de Fútbol players
Racing Lermeño players
Arandina CF players
CD Mirandés footballers
SD Ponferradina players